Southeast Asian College, Inc. (SACI) is a private nonsectarian college in Quezon City, Metro Manila, Philippines.

History

Southeast Asian College was established in 1975 as the United Doctors Medical Center Colleges focusing on offering programs on healthcare. Initially the institution only offered a program in nursing serving around 200 students in its first year. By 1980, new programs were added namely psychology, medical secretarial and general secretarial courses. The school changed its name to its current name in 1997 and a new management took over.

Units
SACI offers college programs in either the Allied Medical and Liberal Arts field. It composes of six units which are the College of Nursing, College of Radiologic Technology, College of Physical Therapy, College of Midwifery, College of Tourism and Hotel and Restaurant Management.

References

Educational institutions established in 1975
1975 establishments in the Philippines
Universities and colleges in Quezon City